Davutlar can refer to:

 Davutlar
 Davutlar, Bigadiç
 Davutlar, Yapraklı